Hosanger Church is a parish church of the Church of Norway in Osterøy Municipality in Vestland county, Norway. It is located in the village of Hosanger on the northern shore of the island of Osterøy. It is the church for the Hosanger parish which is part of the Åsane prosti (deanery) in the Diocese of Bjørgvin. The white, stone church was built in a rectangular design in 1796 by the "leading men" of the parish. The church seats about 275 people.

History
There has been a church at Hosanger since the Middle Ages. The earliest existing historical records of the church date back to the year 1329, but it wasn't built that year. The first church at Hosanger was a wooden stave church that was likely built in the 13th century. Around the year 1600, the old church was torn down and replaced by a timber-framed long church. Around 1660, a tower was built on the church (this may have been a replacement of the original tower or it was the first tower on the church). A report from 1686 described as "very run down" because of poor exterior maintenance, which suggests that the church, at that time was already relatively old. In 1718, a new tower was built on the church. On Christmas Day 1795, lightning struck the church and it burned down. A new stone church was built on the same site the following year. The new church was rectangular with the nave and chancel in the same room.

In 1814, this church served as an election church. Together with more than 300 other parish churches across Norway, it was a polling station for elections to the 1814 Norwegian Constituent Assembly which wrote the Constitution of Norway. This was Norway's first national elections. Each church parish was a constituency that elected people called "electors" who later met together in each county to elect the representatives for the assembly that was to meet in Eidsvoll later that year.

That stone church was renovated and enlarged from 1863–1865. From 1962–1964, the architects Claus Lindstrøm and Jon Lindstrøm renovated the building again. This included the construction of a new sacristy on the south side of the church.

Media gallery

See also
List of churches in Bjørgvin

References

Osterøy
Churches in Vestland
Rectangular churches in Norway
Stone churches in Norway
18th-century Church of Norway church buildings
Churches completed in 1796
13th-century establishments in Norway
Norwegian election church